Portofino is a musical with a book by Richard Ney (who also served as producer), lyrics by Ney and Sheldon Harnick, and music by Louis Bellson and Will Irwin.

Set in a piazza in the Italian resort town of Portofino, the convoluted plot involves auto-racing duke Nicky; his Texan rival Kitty; his granddaughter Angela, a practicing witch; the local padre; and his look-alike Guido, an emissary from the devil.

When critics crucified the show during its Philadelphia tryout, Ney, the producer, democratically left it to the cast to decide if they should continue to New York City. They voted to go.

The Broadway production, directed by Karl Genus and choreographed by Charles Weidman and Ray Harrison with lighting by Lee Watson, opened on February 21, 1958 at the Adelphi Theatre, where it ran for three performances. The cast included Georges Guétary as Nicky, Helen Gallagher as Kitty, Jan Chaney as Angela, and Robert Strauss as both the padre and Guido. It got a number of negative reviews.

Songs

Act I
 Come Along
 No Wedding Bells for Me
 Come Along (Reprise)
 Red-Collar Job
 Here I Come
 New Dreams for Old
 A Dream for Angela
 Isn't It Wonderful?
 Dance of the Whirling Wimpus
 Under a Spell

Act II
 Under a Spell (Reprise)
 That's Love
 Too Little Time for Love
 Guido's Tango
 It Might Be Love
 Here I Come (Reprise)
 Bacchanale
 Morning Prayer
 Kitty Car Ballet
 The Grand Prix of Portofino
 Portofino
 I'm in League with the Devil
 Why Not for Marriage
 Portofino (Reprise)

References

Sources
Not Since Carrie: Forty Years of Broadway Musical Flops by Ken Mandelbaum, published by St. Martin's Press (1991)

External links
 
 Cast album

1958 musicals
Broadway musicals
Musicals by Sheldon Harnick